International Display Works, Inc. manufactures and designs liquid crystal display LCD products internationally though its factories in the People's Republic of China. Its products are found in the telecommunications, automotive, medical, computing, home appliance, and consumer electronics industries.

History
September 16, 2005, Oppenheimer research group initiates a buy 
December 5, 2005, Whirlpool announces it will use IDWK's LCD screens in upcoming washing machines
April 4, 2006, IDWK receives a 5 million dollar order from an undisclosed client
September 5, 2006, Flextronics to acquire International DisplayWorks for $300 Million

Products
International Display Works manufactures many different types of nematics (liquid crystals) which are a main component in LCD televisions. These include twisted nematic, high performance twisted nematic, super-twisted nematic, color super-twisted nematic, and film compensated super-twisted nematic LCDs.

LCD screens are used in many products, including calculators, watches, cellular telephones, washing machines, office equipment, hand held computers, automotive equipment, and medical electronics.

Management
IDWK is managed day-to-day by an executive group composed of members from both China and the United States. As customary for a publicly traded company, IDWK is also overseen by a board of directors that votes on important company decisions. The executive chairman and chief executive officer both hold positions on the board of directors.

References

External links

Companies formerly listed on the Nasdaq
Companies based in Roseville, California
Electronics companies of the United States
Consumer electronics
Electronics companies established in 1999
1999 establishments in California